Heinrich Karl Anton Mücke (9 April 1806 - 16 January 1891) was a prominent Realist painter known for his liturgical and genre paintings as well as frescoes, which still adorn some of Germany's ancient castles and cathedrals.  His paintings are hung today in Germany's leading museums, including the National Gallery Berlin, Breslau Museum and the Brunn Museum.  His son, Karl Mücke, was also a recognized genre painter.  Heinrich Mücke was a professor at the Düsseldorf Academy and received the Portuguese Medal for Art and Sciences as well as the Breslau Medal. He is associated with the Düsseldorf school of painting.

Early life and travels

Heinrich Mücke was born in Breslau, then in Prussia and today in Poland, in the spring of 1806.  He received formal training in art at both the Berlin Academy and the Düsseldorf Academy.  Mücke worked under the well established painter Friedrich Wilhelm Schadow.  Travel was an important element of life to Mücke, Italy being his first extended foreign sojourn over the winter of 1834–35.  Later, in the year 1850 he visited England, while he vacationed in Switzerland many times.  From earliest predilections, he chose historical religious subjects, especially those containing dramatic or exalted themes.

Liturgical paintings

Biblical topics were the first for which Mücke was well known.  In the core of his early painting career he completed such works as: Saint Catherine carried by Angels to Mount Sinai (1836); Saint Ambrose and Emperor Theodosius (1838); Saint Elizabeth taking Farewell of her Husband (1841); Saint Elizabeth Giving Alms (1841), the last of which pieces is hung in the National Gallery Berlin, Alte Nationalgalerie.  Further liturgical oils of the late 1840s,early 1850s and undated works are: Coronation of the Virgin (1847); Saint Adelbert (1851); Cycle of Life of Saint Meinrad; Good Shepherd; and Christ Crucified.

Paintings of noble life, genre scenes and portraiture
Heinrich Mücke also attended to other subject matter, especially while in his early forties.  He enjoyed portraying famous historic people in foreign lands, such as Dante in Verona (1846) and Cleopatra Dying (1873).  The well known Male Portrait (1861) hangs in the Düsseldorf Museum.  Finally to note his genre work, one can turn to his painting Mother and Child (ca. 1850); the latter work was destroyed by wildfire in 2017 from the collection of C. Michael Hogan.

The frescoes

Not content with liturgical art on canvas, Mücke relished the creation of expansive frescoes in some of the superb old buildings in Germany.  The earliest well-known example is a series of many large images produced over a nine-year period at Castle Heltorf near Düsseldorf: Scenes from life of Barbarossa (1829–1938).  In general Mücke's frescoes comprised early compositions, although these works were clearly interleaved in time with his liturgical oil paintings.

Karl Mücke, Heinrich's son

Karl Mücke was born in 1847 and surely studied under his father.  Karl became a distinguished painter in his own right, although not as renowned as his father.  He specialized in genre painting and is recognized for such works as Little Brother, Sunday Afternoon, Mother's Joy, Paternal Joys and Mending Nets on the Coast of Holland.  Karl died on 27 May 1923.

Permanent collections

 Breslau Museum
 Brunn Museum
 Chemnitz Museum
 Düsseldorf Museum
 National Gallery Berlin

Bibliography

 Cyclopedia of Painters, Vol. 3, ed. by John Denison Champlin, Empire State Book Co. (1927)
 E. Benézit, Dictionnaire de Peinteurs, Sculpteurs, Dessinateurs et Graveurs, 1st ed. 1911, revised 1976
 Michael Bryan, Bryan's Dictionary of Painters, C. Bell and Sons, London (1927)
 Wiegmann, p118

19th-century German painters
19th-century German male artists
Düsseldorf school of painting
German male painters
German genre painters
Realist painters
1806 births
1891 deaths
Artists from Wrocław
People from the Province of Silesia
Prussian Academy of Arts alumni